MovieQuik, often misreported in the news as Movie Quik, was a VHS video and VCR rental service offered inside 7-Eleven stores, a division of Southland Corporation, based in the United States and provided by MovieQuik Systems, another fully owned division of Southland  during the late 1980s.

After a few trial runs in isolated areas, the service was launched nationally in 1986. The movies were merchandised on the first gondola at the front of the store and were visible through the front window. Movie-Quik stocked approximately 200 titles in each store.

When Cevaxs took over the service, there was a small machine distributed by Cevaxs at the checkout counter that the store clerk used to check in and check out movies to the customers.

Cevaxs had previously provided similar services to 7-Eleven stores in its native Canada. Cevaxs was forced to shut down the service in 1990 due to the overwhelming debt acquired by the purchase of MovieQuik from Southland.

References

7-Eleven
companies based in Dallas
companies disestablished in the 1990s
video rental services